Baneswara Temple is a Hindu temple in Balasore, Odisha, India. It is one of the oldest in the city. The temple is maintained by group of people called Pujaka.

References 

Hindu temples in Balasore district